Philip Martin Dunn (born June 12, 1971, in Eugene, Oregon) is a male race walker from the United States. He competed for his native country in three consecutive Summer Olympics, starting in 2000 (Sydney, Australia). He is a four-time national US champion in the men's 50 km event (2001-2006-2008-2009).

Achievements

Notes

External links
 
 
 

1971 births
Living people
American male racewalkers
Athletes (track and field) at the 1999 Pan American Games
Athletes (track and field) at the 2003 Pan American Games
Athletes (track and field) at the 2007 Pan American Games
Athletes (track and field) at the 2000 Summer Olympics
Athletes (track and field) at the 2004 Summer Olympics
Athletes (track and field) at the 2008 Summer Olympics
Olympic track and field athletes of the United States
Sportspeople from Eugene, Oregon
Track and field athletes from California
Pan American Games medalists in athletics (track and field)
Pan American Games bronze medalists for the United States
Medalists at the 1999 Pan American Games